Thornhill Hospital is a health facility in Townhead Street, Thornhill, Dumfries and Galloway, Scotland. It is managed by NHS Dumfries and Galloway.

History 
The facility, which was designed by Evan Tweedie, was established as an infectious diseases hospital in 1901. Accommodation was provided for nurses. The hospital joined the National Health Service in 1948.

References 

Hospitals in Dumfries and Galloway
NHS Scotland hospitals
1901 establishments in Scotland
Hospitals established in 1901
Hospital buildings completed in 1901
Thornhill, Dumfries and Galloway